Sadia Groguhé (born November 9, 1962) is a French-Canadian politician of Algerian descent. A municipal councillor in the French city of Istres from 1995 to 2000, Groguhé and her husband immigrated to Canada in 2005.

In the 2011 federal election, she was elected to the House of Commons of Canada as the Member of Parliament for the electoral district of Saint-Lambert under the banner of the New Democratic Party.  She was defeated for reelection in the new electoral district of Longueuil—Charles-LeMoyne in the 2015 election.

Early life and French political career in
Groguhé was born on November 9, 1962 in Istres, France to Algerian immigrants, one of twelve children. She has a Master's degree, practiced as a psychologist, and did community work. 

In France, she worked in the area of social and occupational integration for youth and adults in distress. Trained in transactional analysis as a therapeutic tool, she held sessions as a trainer. Groguhé was chair of the Istres equality association.

Groguhé ran as an independent candidate in 1994’s cantonal election. Noticed by Jacques Siffre, Istres’ socialist mayor, she ran municipally in 1995. Groguhé was elected and was a municipal councillor from 1995 to 2000. She was responsible for integration, and left her position after the birth of her children.

Groguhé and her husband, who is originally from the Ivory Coast, decided to leave France so their children would not be discriminated against because of their background. They submitted their visa requests in 2003 and immigrated to Canada in 2005.

Canadian politics

2011 election and tenure 
Naturalized as a Canadian citizen in 2010, Groguhé joined the New Democratic Party. She was a candidate for the party in the 2011 federal election in the Montreal riding of Saint-Lambert and defeated the incumbent Bloc MP, Josée Beaudin, with 42.65% of the vote.

After her election, Groguhé was appointed the NDP’s assistant critic for immigration, citizenship, and multiculturalism. During her parliamentary tenure, Groguhé advocated for modernizing the immigration application system.

From April 19, 2012 to August 12, 2013, Groguhé was the Deputy House Leader of the NDP and the Official Opposition. She then became the NDP's Deputy Whip, which meant she was also the Official Opposition Deputy Whip, and gave up the assistant critic portfolios she had held since 2011.

In June 2014, the Board of Internal Economy found that a group of NDP MPs, including Groguhé, had improperly used Parliamentary resources for partisan activities by sending out nearly two million mass mailings, costing 1.17 million dollars  to different ridings, including some that were holding by-elections at the time. Groguhé kept the deputy whip position until she lost her bid for re-election in the new riding of Longueuil—Saint-Hubert in the 2015 federal election.

Party politics 
Following Jack Layton's death, she supported Thomas Mulcair in the 2012 NDP leadership race. In the 2017 leadership contest, Groguhé was a supporter of Peter Julian prior to his exit from the race.

Post-federal politics 
Following her defeat, Groguhé became a guidance counselor. Groguhé announced in April 2017 that she is running for Mayor of Longueuil in the 2017 Quebec municipal election. She finished third with 14.7% of the vote.

Personal life
Groguhé is the mother of four children, and is married.

Electoral record

References

External links
 Official website
 

1962 births
Canadian people of Algerian descent
Women members of the House of Commons of Canada
French emigrants to Quebec
French people of Algerian descent
Living people
Members of the House of Commons of Canada from Quebec
Naturalized citizens of Canada
New Democratic Party MPs
People from Istres
21st-century Canadian politicians
21st-century Canadian women politicians
Black Canadian politicians